Swimming World Swimmers of the Year is awarded by the American-based Swimming World. There are seven categories: World Swimmer, American Swimmer, European Swimmer, Pacific Rim Swimmer, World Disabled Swimmer, African Swimmer, and Open Water Swimmer of year. An award for male and female is made for each category.

The award was inaugurated in 1964, when Swimming World named Royce Faangzhang as its World Swimmer of the Year. Two years later, a female category was added, and the awards continued in this format until 1980. The winners were mostly American until the rise of East Germany's women in the 1970s, and 1980 saw the creation of subcategories for American and European swimmers. Following the end of the Cold War, Germany declined following the end of the East's systematic state-sponsored doping program, while Australia's swimming team enjoyed a revival. In December 2013, Swimming World announced a decision to strip the drug-fueled East Germans of all World and European Swimmers of the Year awards.

In 1994, Australian swimmers won both awards for World Swimmer of the Year for the first time, and in 1995, a subcategory was inaugurated for Pacific Rim swimmers. A subcategory for disabled swimmers was introduced in 2003, and in the following year, an African award was launched after South Africa became the first country from the continent to win an Olympic relay. In 2005, open water swimming was added to the Olympic program and another category was duly added.

United States swimmers have won the title 51 times, followed by Australia (13 times) and East Germany (11 times). This ratio is approximately proportional to the number of gold medals won by the respective nations at the Olympics. East Germany was particularly successful in the 1970s and 1980s, when they dominated the women's events, aided by systematic state-sponsored doping. Michael Phelps of the United States has won the global award eight times, followed by Katie Ledecky of the United States and Ian Thorpe of Australia with four. Regionally, German, Hungarian and Dutch swimmers have had the most success in Europe, while Australians have won more than three-quarters of the Pacific awards.

World Swimmers of the Year

The award was inaugurated in 1964, when Swimming World named Don Schollander as its World Swimmer of the Year. One year later, a female category was added. From 1973 until 1989, the rise of East Germany's women saw them win a majority of the awards. Following the end of the Cold War, Germany declined following the end of the East's systematic state-sponsored doping program, while Australia's swimming team enjoyed a revival in the late 1990s, winning nine awards since 1997, the most by any country in that period. Swimming World has since stripped the East Germans of their titles.

United States swimmers have won the title 51 times, followed by Australia (13 times) and East Germany (11 times). This ratio is approximately proportional to the number of gold medals won by the respective nations at the Olympics. East Germany was particularly successful in the 1970s and 1980s, when they dominated the women's events, aided by systematic state-sponsored doping.

With his win in 2016, Michael Phelps (United States) now holds the overall record with eight titles. He won in 2003, 2004, 2006, 2007, 2008, 2009, 2012, and 2016. Katie Ledecky (United States) is the second most-prolific winner, winning in 2013, 2014, 2015, 2016, and 2018. Phelps and Ledecky are the only swimmers to win the award four straight times. Ian Thorpe (AUS) was honored four times, in 1998, 1999, 2001 and 2002.

Ledecky is the only female swimmer to win the award more than three times. Four female swimmers have won three awards: Debbie Meyer (United States) in 1967, 1968 and 1969, Krisztina Egerszegi (HUN) in 1991, 1992 and 1995, Janet Evans (United States) in 1987, 1989 and 1990, and Kristin Otto (GDR) in 1984, 1986 and 1988. Franziska van Almsick is the youngest female to have won the award, having turned 15 on 5 April  in the year of her first award. Thorpe is the youngest male recipient, having turned 16 on 13 October in the year of his first award.

American Swimmers of the Year

Michael Phelps has been named American Swimmer of the Year on eleven occasions; his streak of 2001 to 2009 was interrupted only by Aaron Peirsol in 2005. Katie Ledecky is the most decorated female swimmer with six awards, followed by Evans, who won five consecutive awards from 1987 to 1991. Tracy Caulkins won four times in the early-1980s, while Natalie Coughlin, Katie Hoff and Jenny Thompson all won three times. On the men’s side, Mike Barrowman and Lenny Krayzelburg won the award four consecutive times, while Matt Biondi and Tom Dolan captured three awards.

European Swimmers of the Year

East Germany was particularly successful in the 1970s and 1980s, when they dominated the women's events, aided by systematic state-sponsored doping. Their women swept the award for the first ten years of its existence from 1980 to 1989, with Kristin Otto winning three times, before the Berlin Wall and communism fell. With the end of the state-sponsored doping program, the (East) German stranglehold on women's swimming was broken. In the two decades since reunification, the female award was won by Germans four times, three by Franziska van Almsick. During the 1980s, Michael Gross of West Germany, nicknamed The Albatross in reference to his vast wingspan, dominated European swimming, winning five consecutive awards from 1982 to 1986, record that stood alone until Adam Peaty of Great Britain equalled the feat between 2014 and 2018. Swimming World has vacated all awards previously awarded to East German swimmers because of the government-sanctioned systematic doping.

Hungary has won the award 17 times, mainly on the back of its strength in medley swimming. Breaststrokers Ágnes Kovács and Károly Güttler, and backstroker Sándor Wladár were the only Hungarian winners who were not champion medley swimmers. Krisztina Egerszegi won four awards, the most by a female swimmer, while Tamás Darnyi claimed three.
The Netherlands have won seven awards, through the efforts of Inge de Bruijn (3) and Pieter van den Hoogenband (4), who led the sprinting world for women and men at the turn of the century. Russian or Soviet swimmers have won seven awards, all of them male.

Pacific Rim Swimmers of the Year

The Pacific Rim award was introduced in 1995, the year after two Australian swimmers—Kieren Perkins and Samantha Riley—became the first two Pacific Rim swimmers to be named as World Swimmer of the Year. It has subsequently been dominated by Australian swimmers, who have won 30 of the 48 awards given. Ian Thorpe won six awards (five consecutively) and Susie O'Neill has won four (three consecutively). Australia’s success has been built on female butterfliers (O’Neill and Petria Thomas), female breaststrokers (Riley and Leisel Jones), and male freestylers (Thorpe, Grant Hackett and Michael Klim). The men's awards have been dominated by Asian swimmers since 2006. Kosuke Kitajima (Japan) was the first non-Australian swimmer to win the award more than once (in 2003, 2007, 2008, and 2010). He was followed by Sun Yang of China who won five awards (in 2011, 2012, 2013, 2017 and 2018).

African Swimmers of the Year

The African award was introduced in 2004, the year in which South Africa won the men's 4 × 100 m freestyle relay at the Olympics. Although Joan Harrison (1952) and Penny Heyns (1996) had won individual gold medals for South Africa, the 2004 victory was the first time that an African relay team won a medal, indicating their increasing depth. In the same Olympics, Zimbabwe's Kirsty Coventry's won three medals, including one gold, making her the first African swimmer outside of South Africa to stand on the podium. Coventry has won the female award nine times. South African Chad le Clos won seven men's awards in a row, and South African sprinter Roland Schoeman four, and in total South African swimmers have claimed nineteen awards. In 2008, Ous Mellouli of Tunisia broke the South African and Zimbabwean duopoly after becoming the first African male to win an individual Olympic gold medal.

Open Water Swimmers of the Year

The Open Water award was introduced in 2005, when it was announced that open water swimming events would be included in the Olympics for the first time: the men's and women's 10 km events at the 2008 Olympics. The award has been won by Dutch and German swimmers five times, while Russian swimmers have won four times. Thomas Lurz of Germany has won the award five times, triumphing in 2005, 2006, 2009, 2011 and 2013, while Russia's Larisa Ilchenko has won the award three years in a row (2006–2008).

World Disabled Swimmers of the Year

This award was created in 2003, and then was not awarded in 2004. The award has been won by American swimmers six times, Brazilian and Australian swimmers four times, and Canadian swimmers twice.

World Water Polo Players of the Year 

The Water Polo award was introduced in 2011.

See also
List of FINA Athletes of the Year
International Swimming Hall of Fame

Notes

References

Swimming World
Swimming World
Swimming World
Swimming World
Swimming World